Sylvia Estes Stark (1839 – 1944) is a noted African-American pioneer and Salt Spring Island resident, who was among 600 African Americans who migrated to the newly formed Colony of British Columbia.

Biography
Sylvia Estes was born into slavery in Clay County, Missouri, the youngest of three children of Hannah and Howard Estes. Her father, who had lived apart from their family for most of their lives, bought them out of slavery for $4,000 in 1852 - an enormous sum at the time. The family moved to California. Faced with educational and other social barriers, the family joined a group of people who sent a delegation to speak about resettling there – they had an audience with British Columbia Governor James Douglas, who was of Creole descent. 

In 1855, Sylvia married Louis Stark, a farmer at age 16. Louis Stark was 10 years older than herself. They emigrated to Canada during the 1858 BC Gold Rush, taking a ship with 600 African Americans, under the threat of the Fugitive Slave Act and the Dred Scott v. Sandford decision. In 1860, Stark, her husband Louis and her two small children, Emma Arabella and Willis Otis traveled by boat and settled at Salt Spring Island, bringing along with them 50 head of cattle and horses. The family then cleared land and made a home and orchard. Over the next fifteen years, the Louis and Sylvia stark had four more children at Salt Spring, John Edmond, Abraham Lincoln, Hannah Serena and Marie Albertina. They survived the 1862 Pacific Northwest smallpox epidemic and then moved twice throughout the years, due to encounters with Aboriginal people and murders of their two friends.  

In 1875, the family moved to Cedar, British Columbia, just outside Nanaimo. However, Sylvia missing Salt Spring, returned to the farm in 1885 with her son Willis and her father, Howard, who was now a widower. Sylvia spent the rest of her life on Salt Spring Island and ran the farm in Fruitvale with her son Willis. She died on Salt Spring Island in 1944, aged 106, and was buried beside her father at Pioneer Cemetery, Ganges, Salt Spring Island.

References

Crawford Kilian. "What BC Women Should Be on Canadian Bank Notes?" The Tyee.
Estes/Stark Family. Salt Spring Archives.
Sylvia Stark. Black History Awareness Society.

1839 births
1944 deaths
People from Clay County, Missouri
19th-century American slaves
American emigrants to pre-Confederation British Columbia
Canadian people of African-American descent
Black Canadian women
History of Black people in British Columbia
Canadian centenarians
African-American centenarians
American centenarians
Women centenarians
19th-century African-American women